The Christmas Secret is a 2000 American made-for-television family fantasy-drama film starring Richard Thomas and Beau Bridges based on the speculative book Flight of the Reindeer written by Robert Sullivan. It premiered on CBS on December 17, 2000.

As of 2009, it was shown in the 25 Days of Christmas programming block on ABC Family, but it was not part of the block in 2010. It was shown as part of the Twelve Days of Christmas on The Inspiration Network (INSP) Channel in 2012.

Plot
A respected zoology professor (Richard Thomas) who is obsessed with proving that reindeer can actually fly meets up with the real Santa Claus (Beau Bridges).

Cast
Richard Thomas as Jerry McNeil
Beau Bridges as Nick (Santa Claus)
Maria Pitillo as Debbie
Jan Rubeš as Andree
John Franklin as Morluv
Debbie Lee Carrington as Gorah

See also 
 List of Christmas films
 Santa Claus in film

External links
 

2000 television films
2000 films
2000s fantasy drama films
2000s Christmas drama films
American children's fantasy films
American Christmas drama films
Santa Claus in film
CBS network films
Christmas television films
2000s American films